Chad Bannon (born November 13, 1970), also credited as Chad Ullery, is an American television and movie actor. Standing 6’4” and weighing 250 pounds, he is best known for his role as Killer Karl in House of 1000 Corpses and playing D.O.A. on the sports entertainment program "Battle Dome". He also competed as a professional kickboxer and mixed martial artist.

Modeling and acting
Bannon landed the cover of Advocate Men's October 1995 issue. He modeled for celebrated male nude photographer Jim French in 1995 under the name of Dusty Manning, appearing in B+W Photoset J49 of ten images, and Color Photosets CP338 and CP339 of six images each.  These and other contemporaneous photos were used subsequently in a number of high-quality Jim French and Colt Studio publications, including SPURS Magazine #25 [1997], the Jim French Annual Man Calendar 1997, the Jim French Annual Man Desk Calendar 1997, Colt Leather Calendar 1997, Colt Leather Calendar 1998, Colt Leather Calendar 2000, Colt Studio Presents Magazine #21 [2000], Colt Butt Beautiful Calendar 2002, and the second of the two Colt Studio 35th Anniversary Albums.  He made his acting debut in the Chi Chi LaRue-directed erotic film Behind the Barn Door playing the love interest of Bo Summers. Bannon then starred in independent horror comedy film Kill Madonna  and eventually landed roles in major motion pictures like Planet of the Apes and House of 1000 Corpses.
Chad has also been mentioned numerous times on the Joe Rogan Experience podcast as the mystery cage fighter who was also the recipient of the 'Hungriest Butt Award'.

Martial arts

Bannon went on to pursue a career as a mixed martial artist and kickboxer and competed for King of the Cage and K-1 as part of Bob Sapp's "Team Beast". He fought Rick Collup in 2002 at King of the Cage: 18 Sudden Impact, knocking him out in only 20 seconds.

Bannon then fought Tatsufumi Tomihira at K-1 Beast 2003 in Yamagata, Japan and lost in a unanimous decision. Bannon is a heavyweight, weighing 245 lbs and standing at 6'4".

Kickboxing record

|-
|-  bgcolor="#FFBBBB"
| 2003-04-06 || Loss ||align=left| Tatsufumi Tomihira || K-1 Beast 2003 || Yamagata, Japan || Decision (unanimous) || 3 || 3:00 || 0-1
|-
|-
| colspan=9 | Legend:

Mixed martial arts record

|-
| Win
| align=center| 1-0
| Rick Collup
| KO (punches)
| KOTC 18 - Sudden Impact
| 
| align=center| 1
| align=center| 0:20
| 
|

Appearances
 Behind the Barn Door 1993 (Catalina Video) — Jack
 Kill Madonna 1996
 White Men With Big Dicks 1996 (TLA Video) — Chad Anthony
 Step By Step 1997 — Frankie
 The Eddie Files 1997 — Burly Cop
 Quick Study: Sex Ed 1 (1998) — Todd Marshall
 A Night at the Roxbury 1998 — New Club Bouncer
 Pacific Blue 1999 — Wall
 V.I.P. 1999 — Beefy Guy
 Battle Dome 1999-2000, — D.O.A.
 Deus Ex 2000 — various voices
 Planet of the Apes 2001 — Red Ape Soldier/Man Hunt Ape
 House of 1000 Corpses 2003 — Killer Karl
 Bullets in the Gun (music video) by Toby Keith - Lightning

See also 
 List of Rob Zombie characters
 List of male kickboxers
 Christian Boeving
 Andrew Bryniarski

References

External links
 
 K-1 Sport profile
 

1970 births
Male actors from Colorado
American bodybuilders
American male film actors
American male kickboxers
Male models from Colorado
American male mixed martial artists
American male television actors
Heavyweight kickboxers
Heavyweight mixed martial artists
Kickboxers from Colorado
Living people
Mixed martial artists from Colorado